Alexander Kennedy "Ken" Kirkpatrick (born 25 July 1938 in Belfast, Northern Ireland) is an Irish former cricketer. A left-handed batsman and off spin bowler, he played twice for the Ireland cricket team in 1962; a first-class match against the Combined Services and against Pakistan.

References

1938 births
Living people
Irish cricketers
Cricketers from Belfast
Cricketers from Northern Ireland